"Orangedale Whistle" is a song recorded by Canadian music group The Rankin Family. It was released in 1992 as the first single from their second studio album, Fare Thee Well Love. It peaked in the top 10 on the RPM Country Tracks chart.

Chart performance

Year-end charts

References

1990 songs
1992 singles
The Rankin Family songs
Capitol Records singles
Songs written by Jimmy Rankin